Sydney Young may refer to:

 Syd Young (1918–2013), Australian rules footballer
 Sydney Young (chemist) (1857–1937), English chemist